The Noble Correctional Institution  is a medium-security prison for men located in Caldwell, Noble County, Ohio and operated by the Ohio Department of Rehabilitation and Correction.  The facility first opened in 1996 and has a population of 2482 state inmates.

References

Prisons in Ohio
Buildings and structures in Noble County, Ohio
1996 establishments in Ohio